Saaphabee is a 1976 Indian Meitei language film written by Sarangthem Bormani, produced by G. Narayan Sharma and directed by Aribam Syam Sharma. The film features Kangabam Tomba and Ngangom (O) Subadani in the lead roles. It was released at Usha Cinema, Paona Bazar on 13 July 1976. The movie won the National Film Award for Best Feature Film in Manipuri at the 24th National Film Awards. It is based on the famous Manipuri folk play Haorang Leishang Saaphabee. It is the first Manipuri folk film.

Synopsis
It is the immortal love story of prince Loya Naha Saaphaba, son of Thongnang, the king of Khuman region and princess Haorang Leishang Saaphabee, daughter of Tabung, king of Kege region. The film focuses on Kege region and Khuman region settled in opposite side of Loktak Lake, the biggest fresh water lake in North East India. The two kings are good friends and even swear that their son and daughter shall marry when they grow up. King Tabung does not recognize prince Saaphaba and kills him as he has mistaken him an intruder. Princess Saaphabee also kills herself. Heartbroken Tabung and Thongnang decide to kill themselves in a spear fight to follow them. Khamnung Kikoi Louonbi, the ancient Meitei goddess of death concealing her appearance in the sky with a thunderous voice stops them in the midst of lighting and thunder. Saaphaba and Saaphabee are seen in the sky proceeding towards the feet of the Almighty God.

(Meghachandra Kongbam, Imphal Review of Arts and Politics)

Cast
 Kangabam Tomba as Loya Naha Saaphaba
 Laishram Ningol Ngangom Ongbi Subadani as Haorang Leishang Saaphabee
 Manbi as Saaphabee's mother
 N. Tombi as Tabung, King of Kege region, Saaphabee's father
 Soraisam Keshoram as Thongnang, King of Khuman region, Saaphaba's father
 Kshetrimayum Rashi as Saaphabee's friend
 Heisnam Ongbi Indu as Saaphabee's friend
 Babu
 Shanti
 Gouri
 Open

Soundtrack
Aribam Syam Sharma composed the soundtrack for the film and Konsaba Ibochou and G. Joykumar Sharma wrote the lyrics. The movie has four songs sung by Aheibam Syam Sharma, Arambam Jamuna and Khun Joykumar.

References

External links
 
 

1976 films
Meitei-language films
Meitei folklore in popular culture
Meitei mythology in popular culture
Indian black-and-white films
Films directed by Aribam Syam Sharma